Up on the Lowdown is an album by the American musician Chris Smither, released in 1995. It was recorded at The Hit Shack, in Austin, Texas. "What Was It You Wanted" is a cover of the Bob Dylan song.

Critical reception

The St. Petersburg Times noted that "Smither's punchy guitar work plays host to a stripped-down backing of primarily bass, drums and keyboard." The Boston Globe wrote that "the roots-rocky texture suits his exquisitely rambunctious guitar and wise lyrics."

Track listing
All songs by Chris Smither unless otherwise noted.
 "Link of Chain" – 3:50
 "'Deed I Do" – 3:38
 "What Was It You Wanted" (Bob Dylan) – 5:16
 "Up on the Lowdown" – 4:16
 "Bittersweet" – 3:32
 "Talk Memphis" (Jesse Winchester) – 3:09
 "Can't Shake These Blues" (Steve Tilston) – 3:28
 "I Am the Ride"– 3:51
 "Time to Go Home" – 4:17
 "Jailhouse Blues" (Traditional) – 5:24

Personnel
Chris Smither – vocals, guitar
Chris Maresh - bass
Mickey Raphael - harmonica
Riley Osbourne - harmonica, keyboards
Brannen Temple - drums, percussion

Production
Produced by Stephen Bruton
Mastered by Jerry Tubb

References

1995 albums
Chris Smither albums